Vengeance is a 1930 American pre-Code drama film directed by Archie Mayo.

Cast 
 Jack Holt - John Meadham
 Dorothy Revier - Margaret Summers
 Philip Strange - Charles Summers
 George Pearce - Doctor 
 Hayden Stevenson - Ambassador
 Irma Harrison - Nidia
 Onest Conley - Chief

References

External links 

1930 drama films
1930 films
1930s action films
American action drama films
American black-and-white films
1930s American films